The Amsterdam Houses is a housing project in New York City that was established in the borough of Manhattan in 1948. The project consists of 13 buildings with over 1,000 apartment units. It covers a  9-acre expanse of the Upper West Side, and is bordered by West 61st and West 64th Streets, from Amsterdam Avenue to West End Avenue, with a 175-apartment addition that was completed in 1974 on West 65th Street between Amsterdam Avenue and West End Avenue. It is owned and managed by New York City Housing Authority (NYCHA).

History 
The Amsterdam Houses were created on land that was once tenement buildings and were created for residents to have a higher standard of living. Three playgrounds were built for children of various ages and the development housed a nursery, gymnasium, clinic and a community center. With the opening of Lincoln Center in the 1960s, the neighborhood began to gentrify and saw many older residents retaining their apartments with 70% of heads of households over the age of 62. The demographics living in this development were initially mixed, as it served to house post-war families in affordable housing. Today, mostly black families occupy the Amsterdam Houses.

Notable people 

 Erik Estrada (born 1949), actor known for his role on CHiPs
 Daphne Maxwell Reid (born 1948), actress known for her role on The Fresh Prince of Bel-Air

See also
New York City Housing Authority
List of New York City Housing Authority properties

References

Public housing in Manhattan